Mamatin-e Olya (also Romanized as Māmātīn-e ‘Olyā; also known as Māmātayn-e Bālā, Māmātin, and Māmātīn-e Bālā) is a village in Howmeh-ye Sharqi Rural District, in the Central District of Ramhormoz County, Khuzestan Province, Iran. At the 2006 census, its population was 98, in 20 families.

References 

Populated places in Ramhormoz County